Art of Dying is a Canadian rock band from Vancouver, formed in 2004 by lead singer Jonny Hetherington and guitarist Greg Bradley. Soon after, the duo added Chris Witoski on rhythm guitar, bassist Matt Rhode, and drummer Flavio Cirillo.

History
In 2006, Art of Dying released their first album, Art of Dying on Thorny Bleeder Records. In February 2007, Classic Rock Magazine released the compilation Classic Rock: The Bands You Need to Hear in 2007, and included the Art of Dying song "Completely". The band then supported Seether on the UK leg of their world tour. 

On December 1, 2009, it was announced that the band had signed a record deal with Reprise Records and its division Intoxication Records, founded by Disturbed members David Draiman and Dan Donegan.  Witoski and Rhode left the band and were replaced by bassist Cale Gontier and guitarist Tavis Stanley, both previously of the band Thornley. 

Art of Dying's second album, Vices and Virtues, produced by Howard Benson and mixed by Chris Lord-Alge, was released on March 22, 2011. Half of the songs were new; the others were remixed versions of songs from the band's first album. It was not well-received. Art of Dying went on its 'Avalanche Tour', performing 128 concerts in 2011. In addition to headlining and co-headlining club shows, the band played some of the biggest hard rock and heavy metal festivals in the country. They played the 2011 and 2012 Avalanche Tours, headlined by Stone Sour and Shinedown, respectively, and toured on Rockstar's 2011 Uproar Festival, headlined by Avenged Sevenfold.

Let the Fire Burn, a completely acoustic album, was released on April 24, 2012. The band continued to tour heavily in the US, playing several dates with Papa Roach and Buckcherry, opening for Marilyn Manson and appearing at the Rock Vegas Festival and KUPD's first annual Desert Uprising in Phoenix.

In 2014, Art of Dying was signed to Better Noise Records (now Better Noise Music). In 2015, the band toured as the opening act for the cello-metal band Apocalyptica during the North American leg of its Shadowmaker tour. In December 2015, they released the album Rise Up. It was produced by David Bendeth at House of Loud and received excellent reviews.

In 2016, the band self-released the six-track EP Nevermore and stayed on the road.

In 2017, Art of Dying announced on Facebook that drummer Jeff Brown, who had replaced Flavio Cirillo in 2008, left the band to "pursue a different path". He was replaced by longtime drum tech and stage manager Cody Watkins.

In 2019, still without a label, the band released its fifth album, Armageddon. 

In 2020, Thorny Bleeder Records released the 11-track Art of Dying Compilation album, Demos & Rarities (2003-2007).

Band members
 Jonny Hetherington – lead vocals (2004–present)
 Cody Watkins – drums, backing vocals (2016–present)
 Cale Gontier – bass, backing vocals (2008–present)
 Tavis Stanley – rhythm guitar, backing vocals (2008–present), lead guitar (2015–present)

Former members
 Chris Witoski – rhythm guitar (2004–2008)
 Matt Rhode – bass (2004–2008)
 Flavio Cirillo – drums (2004–2008)
 Greg Bradley – lead guitar (2004–2015)
 Jeff Brown – drums (2008–2016)

 Timeline

Discography 

Studio albums
 Art of Dying (2006), Thorny Bleeder Records
 Vices and Virtues (2011), Reprise Records
 Let the Fire Burn (2012), Thorny Bleeder Records
 Rise Up (2015), Better Noise Records, Eleven Seven Music
 Armageddon (2019), Vices and Virtues Music

EPs
 Get Through This (2007), Revolver Records
 Rise Up (2015), Better Noise Records
 Nevermore (2016), Vices and Virtues Music
 Nevermore Acoustic (2017), Vices and Virtues Music
 Ready For a Good Time (2022), Vices and Virtues Music

Compilations
 Demos & Rarities (2003-2007) (2020), Thorny Bleeder Records

Singles

Music videos

References

External links
 
 Interview with Art Of Dying on UpVenue
 Interview with Jonny Hetherington, HitQuarters Jan 2011
 Bradley's 2011 Art of Dying Guitar Rig. GuitarGeek.Com

Musical groups established in 2004
Musical groups from Vancouver
Canadian post-grunge groups
2004 establishments in British Columbia